George Michael Dolenz Jr. (born March 8, 1945) is an American actor, musician, TV producer and businessman. He was the drummer and one of two primary vocalists for the pop-rock band the Monkees (1966–1970, and multiple reunions through 2021), and a co-star of the TV series The Monkees (1966–1968). Following the death of Michael Nesmith in 2021, Dolenz is the only surviving member of the band.

Life and entertainment career
Dolenz was born at the Cedars of Lebanon Hospital in Los Angeles, California, the son of actors George Dolenz and Janelle Johnson. He has three sisters, Gemma Marie ("Coco"; born April 5, 1949), Deborah (born 1958), and Kathleen ("Gina"; born 1960). Gemma's nickname, Coco, is a shortened form of "Coco Sunshine", a nickname given to her as a child by Micky. Coco was a frequent guest on the set of The Monkees TV show and sometimes a guest performer on records by the Monkees, singing background vocals or duetting with Micky. She often performs as a member of Micky's backing band during his concerts.

Dolenz suffered from Perthes disease as a child, affecting his hip joint and right leg, leaving that leg weaker (and shorter) than the other. This resulted in Dolenz adapting an unorthodox drum setup – right-handed and left-footed – in his musical career.

Circus Boy 

Dolenz began his show-business career in 1956 when he starred in a children's TV show called Circus Boy under the name Mickey Braddock. He played Corky, an orphaned water boy for the elephants in a one-ring circus at the start of the 20th century. The program ran for two seasons, after which Dolenz made sporadic appearances on network television shows and pursued his education. Dolenz went to Ulysses S. Grant High School in Valley Glen, Los Angeles, California and graduated in 1962. In 1964, he was cast as Ed in the episode "Born of Kings and Angels" of the NBC education drama series Mr. Novak, starring James Franciscus as an idealistic Los Angeles teacher. Dolenz was attending college in Los Angeles when he was hired for the "drummer" role in NBC's The Monkees.

Early musical career
Dolenz originally had his own rock band called "Micky and the One-Nighters" in the early- to mid-1960s with himself as lead singer. He had already begun writing his own songs. According to Dolenz, his band's live stage act included rock songs, cover songs, and even some R&B. One of his favorite songs to sing was Chuck Berry's "Johnny B. Goode", which he sang at his Monkees audition, resulting in his being hired as one of the cast/band members. He recorded two 45s in 1965 that went unreleased until the Monkees' success in 1967. Issued on the Challenge label, the recordings were "Don't Do It" b/w "Plastic Symphony III" and "Huff Puff" b/w "Fate (Big Ben)". Neither B-side on the Challenge 45s is by Dolenz, but rather a band later credited as The Obvious.

The Monkees

In 1965, Dolenz was cast in the television sitcom The Monkees and became the drummer and a lead vocalist in the band created for the show. He was not actually a drummer and needed lessons to be able to mime credibly, but eventually was taught how to play properly. By the time the Monkees went on tour in late 1966, Dolenz was competent enough to play the drums himself.

Tommy Boyce and Bobby Hart, writers of many of the Monkees' songs, observed quickly that when brought into the studio together, the four actors would try to make each other laugh. Because of this, the writers  often brought in each singer individually. The antics escalated until Dolenz poured a cup of ice on Don Kirshner's head. At the time, Dolenz did not know Kirshner on sight.

According to Michael Nesmith, Dolenz's voice made the Monkees' sound distinctive, and during tension-filled times, Nesmith and Peter Tork voluntarily turned over lead vocal duties to Dolenz on their own compositions.

Dolenz wrote a few of the band's self-penned songs, most prominently "Randy Scouse Git" from the album Headquarters. He provided the lead vocals for such hits as "Last Train to Clarksville", "Pleasant Valley Sunday", and "I'm a Believer". Dolenz also directed and co-wrote the show's final episode.

Dolenz purchased the third modular Moog synthesizer sold commercially. (The first two belonged to Wendy Carlos and Buck Owens.) His performance on the Monkees' song "Daily Nightly" (written by Nesmith), from the album Pisces, Aquarius, Capricorn & Jones Ltd., was one of the first uses of the synthesizer on a rock recording. He eventually sold his instrument to Bobby Sherman.

He is the last surviving member of the Monkees (after Davy Jones's death in 2012, Tork's in 2019, and Nesmith's in 2021). He is the only member of the Monkees who was part of every lineup from the band's inception, and the only member with contemporary recordings of his vocals on all studio albums.

Solo MGM recordings

The Moog synthesizer that Dolenz had bought proved vital when he composed a song entitled "Easy on You" in 1971; he began recording it in his home studio, playing acoustic guitar and drums, and using the Moog like a keyboard. With that song completed, he next invited former Monkee Peter Tork over to help with more recordings. Then, a fortuitous street encounter led to former Monkee stand-in David Price joining, as well as contributing a rock song he had written called "Oh Someone". With Dolenz on drums and vocals, Tork on bass, and Price on rhythm guitar, the song was completed in only two hours; subsequently, guitarist B.J. Jones came in two days later and added lead guitar. With these two songs recorded, Dolenz contacted his former high school friend Mike Curb, then the head of MGM Records; after playing the songs for Curb, Dolenz was immediately signed to MGM.

Dolenz recorded and released songs for MGM for about three years (with a few of the songs being credited to Starship, an ersatz group, not the later Jefferson Starship). After the first year, Dolenz's friend Harry Nilsson contributed his song "Daybreak", also arranging and producing the recording, which included Keith Allison on guitar, former Monkees producer Chip Douglas on bass, and steel-guitarist Orville "Red" Rhodes.

By early 1974, with no chart successes to date, Dolenz headed to England, and with Tony Scotti, he cut four songs for MGM: two rock classics, "Splish Splash" and "Purple People Eater", as well as "I Hate Rock and Roll" and a new song, "Wing Walker". Meanwhile, Mike Curb left MGM and joined Warner Bros. Records. Dolenz's association with MGM then ended (and those final four songs remained unreleased).

Dolenz, Jones, Boyce, and Hart
Due in part to reruns of The Monkees on Saturday mornings and in syndication, The Monkees Greatest Hits charted in 1976. The LP, issued by Arista (a subsidiary of Columbia Pictures), was actually a repackaging of a 1972 compilation LP called Re-Focus that had been issued by Arista's previous label imprint, Bell Records, also owned by Columbia Pictures.

Dolenz and Jones took advantage of this, joining ex-Monkees songwriters Tommy Boyce and Bobby Hart to tour the United States. They could not use the Monkees name for legal reasons, but from 1975 to 1977, as the "Golden Hits of The Monkees" show ("The Guys Who Wrote 'Em and the Guys Who Sang 'Em!"), they successfully performed in smaller venues such as state fairs and amusement parks, as well as making stops in Japan, Thailand, and Singapore. They also released an album of new material, appropriately called Dolenz, Jones, Boyce & Hart, and a live album, Concert in Japan, was released by Capitol in 1976.

Nesmith had not been interested in a reunion. Tork also did not participate, as they didn't know where he was at that time to invite him. A Christmas single (credited to Dolenz, Jones and Tork) was produced by Chip Douglas and released on his own label in 1976. The single featured Douglas's and Howard Kaylan's "Christmas Is My Time of Year" (originally recorded by a 1960s supergroup, The Christmas Spirit), with a B-side of Irving Berlin's "White Christmas" (Douglas released a remixed version of the single, with additional overdubbed instruments, in 1986). Tork also joined Dolenz, Jones, Boyce & Hart on stage at Disneyland on July 4, 1976, and also joined Dolenz and Jones on stage at the Starwood in Hollywood, California in 1977.

Notable stage work

In 1977, he performed with former bandmate Davy Jones in a stage production of the Harry Nilsson musical The Point! at London's Mermaid Theatre, playing and singing the part of the "Count's Kid" and the Leafman to Jones' starring role as Oblio (according to the CD booklet). An original cast recording was made and released. The comedic chemistry of Dolenz and Jones proved so strong that the show was revived in 1978 with Nilsson inserting additional comedy for the two, plus two more songs, with one of them ("Gotta Get Up") being sung by Dolenz and Jones together. The show was considered so good that it was planned to be revived again in 1979, but it proved cost-prohibitive. After the show's run, Dolenz remained in England and began directing for stage and television, as well as producing several of the shows he directed.
 
From August to September 2006, Dolenz played Charlemagne at the Goodspeed Opera House for the revival of the musical Pippin in East Haddam, Connecticut. He also toured in that role. Also in the mid-2000s, Dolenz played the role of Zoser in the Broadway production of Elton John and Tim Rice's Aida.

After Monkees television and film career
After The Monkees television show ended, Dolenz continued performing providing voice-overs for a number of Saturday-morning cartoon series including The Funky Phantom, Partridge Family 2200 A.D., The Scooby-Doo Show, Butch Cassidy and the Sundance Kids, These Are the Days, Devlin, and Wonder Wheels (from The Skatebirds). Dolenz provided the voice of Arthur in the first season of the animated series The Tick. In 1972, Dolenz played Vance in the murder mystery film Night of the Strangler. He was featured in an episode of Adam-12, entitled "Dirt Duel" (season 5, episode 1), and an episode of Cannon, entitled "Bitter Legion" (season 2, episode 3). Dolenz provided the voice of Two-Face's twin henchmen Min and Max in the two-part episode "Two-Face" on Batman: The Animated Series. In a September 2006 radio interview, Dolenz reported that he was the current voice of Snuggle the Fabric Softener Bear at that time.  In 2017, Dolenz returned to voice-over, providing the voice of Wendell the Love Grub, as well as singing the featured song, in the Cartoon Network series Mighty Magiswords half-hour episode, "The Saga of Robopiggeh!". Dolenz recorded the voice-acting remotely in New York weeks before his Good Times! tour.

Both Dolenz and Michael Nesmith auditioned for the role of Arthur "The Fonz" Fonzarelli on Happy Days, but neither was selected due to both being taller (6 ft., 1 in.) than lead actor Ron Howard (Richie Cunningham), who is 5 ft., 9 in. tall, and co-stars Anson Williams (Warren "Potsie" Weber) and Don Most (Ralph Malph), both under 6 ft. The producers preferred a shorter Fonzie in hopes that Fonzie would not overshadow the rest of the cast, a strategy that eventually proved to be unsuccessful, as the Fonz would be the show's breakout character. A search for a shorter actor eventually resulted in Henry Winkler's hiring.

In 1975, Dolenz acted in Linda Lovelace for President, starring Linda Lovelace.

Early in the development of Batman Forever, Dolenz was a contender for the role of the Riddler, which ultimately went to Jim Carrey.

In 1994–95, Dolenz played in two episodes of the sitcom Boy Meets World; in the first one (entitled "Band on the Run"), he played Norm, a bandmate of Alan Matthews. In 1995, he joined Davy Jones and Peter Tork in episode eight of the third season (entitled "Rave On"), although they did not play the Monkees, per se – Dolenz's character is "Gordy", while Davy Jones is "Reginald Fairfield" and Tork is "Jedidiah Lawrence". However, at the climax of the program, the three are put on stage together and perform the classic Buddy Holly song "Not Fade Away", and the Temptations' "My Girl". As an inside joke, actor Dave Madden, who had played the manager on The Partridge Family, cameoed as a manager; he suddenly appears, wanting to handle the "new" group, and tells them that they "could be bigger than The Beatles", which they all scoff at.

In 2007, he appeared in Rob Zombie's remake of Halloween as Derek Allan, the owner of a gun shop.

On January 29, 2011, Dolenz appeared in the Syfy Channel film Mega Python vs. Gatoroid, alongside Debbie Gibson and Tiffany. On February 21, 2015, he had a cameo as himself in the Adult Swim TV special Bagboy. In 2017, he appeared as himself on the sitcom Difficult People.

Directorial work
In 1980, Dolenz produced and directed the British television sitcom Metal Mickey, featuring a large metallic robot with the catch-phrase "boogie boogie". In 1981, he directed a short film based on the sketch "Balham, Gateway to the South", with Robbie Coltrane playing multiple roles. In the early 1980s, Dolenz directed a stage adaptation of Bugsy Malone. He was producer of the TV show Luna in 1983–84.

MTV reignites Monkee Mania
In 1986, a screening of the entire Monkees television series by MTV led to renewed interest in the band, followed by a single, "That Was Then, This Is Now", which reached No. 20 on the Billboard Hot 100 in the U.S., a 20th-anniversary tour, a greatest hits album, and a brand new LP, Pool It! in 1987. The band's original albums were reissued, and all hit the record charts at the same time.

Beginning in 1986, Dolenz joined the other ex-Monkees for several reunion tours and toured extensively as a solo artist. He continued to direct for television both in the United Kingdom and the United States, and had occasional acting gigs, including roles in the TV series The Equalizer and as the mayor on the cable TV series Pacific Blue.

WCBS-FM 

On January 10, 2005, Dolenz replaced Dan Taylor as the morning disc jockey at oldies radio station WCBS-FM in New York. On June 3, 2005, Dolenz celebrated his 100th show with a special morning show at B.B. King's. In an ironic and controversial twist, that was also his last regular show at the station; at 5:00 pm, WCBS-FM announced that the station would replace its oldies format with a "Jack" format, eliminating the need for on-air disc jockeys.

However, WCBS-FM eventually returned to its oldies format on July 12, 2007, with Taylor re-assuming his role as the morning disc jockey the following day. Several months later, on February 3, 2008, Dolenz was invited back to the station to present his long-postponed 101st show and final in-studio appearance there by guest-hosting a three-hour broadcast during WCBS' Sunday evening "New York Radio Greats" program.

Solo work and further Monkees reunions 
In 2009, Dolenz signed a deal to record an album of the classic songs of Carole King, titled King for a Day. The album (released on Gigitone Records) was produced by Jeffrey Foskett, who has worked extensively with Brian Wilson and played on Wilson's 2004 Grammy-winning Brian Wilson Presents Smile. King's songs "Pleasant Valley Sunday", "Sometime in the Morning", and "Porpoise Song" (Theme from Head) have emerged as signature songs from the Monkees. As of February 2010, he was appearing on stage in London in Hairspray with Michael Ball. The show also went on tour and had a successful run in Dublin, Ireland, during November 2010. In 2011, he rejoined Tork and Jones for An Evening with The Monkees: The 45th Anniversary Tour. 
 
After Jones' sudden death in February 2012, Dolenz and Tork reunited with Michael Nesmith for a 12-concert tour of the United States as a tribute. The three remaining Monkees toured again in 2013 and 2014 and Dolenz toured as a duo with Tork in 2015 and 2016.

Following Tork's death in 2019, Dolenz toured with Nesmith as "The Mike and Micky Show" in 2018 and 2019. On May 4, 2021, Dolenz and Nesmith announced "The Monkees Farewell Tour" which was the last for the group. The tour consisted of 40 US dates from September to November. The final show was held on November 14, 2021, at the Greek Theatre in Los Angeles, California.

On May 21, 2021, Dolenz released a solo album, Dolenz Sings Nesmith, featuring songs written by Nesmith and produced by Christian Nesmith.

Other tours
In late 2019, Dolenz toured with Todd Rundgren, Jason Scheff, Christopher Cross, and Joey Molland of Badfinger, in celebration of the Beatles' White Album on the "It Was Fifty Years Ago Today – A Tribute to the Beatles' White Album" tour. Dolenz performed the Monkees' songs "I'm a Believer" and "Pleasant Valley Sunday".

Personal life
Dolenz has been married three times and is the father of four daughters. In 1967, while in the UK on tour with the Monkees, Dolenz met future wife Samantha Juste, a co-presenter on BBC TV's pop music show Top of the Pops. They married in 1968, and their daughter Ami Bluebell Dolenz was born on January 8, 1969; she became an actress who was particularly active in the 1980s and 1990s. Dolenz and Juste divorced in 1975, but remained close friends until her death following a stroke on February 5, 2014.

He married Trina Dow in 1977. The couple had three daughters: Charlotte Janelle (born August 8, 1981), Emily Claire (born July 25, 1983), and Georgia Rose (born September 3, 1984). They divorced in 1991. Trina Dow Dolenz has become a couples therapist, still using her married name. Dolenz married his third wife, Donna Quinter, in 2002.

Discography

Albums
Dolenz, Jones, Boyce & Hart (Capitol, 1976) - with Dolenz, Jones, Boyce & Hart
Concert in Japan (Capitol, 1976) - live, with Dolenz, Jones, Boyce & Hart
The Point! (MCA, 1977) - with the London cast of The Point! (MCA Records - VIM 6262; CD release 2016, Varèse Sarabande)
Micky Dolenz Puts You to Sleep (Kid Rhino, 1991)
Broadway Micky (Kid Rhino, 1994)
Demoiselle (self-released, 1998)
King for a Day (Gigatone, 2010)
Remember (Robo, 2012)
A Little Bit Broadway, a Little Bit Rock and Roll (Broadway, 2015) - live
An Evening With Peter Noone & Micky Dolenz (7A Records, 2016) - spoken word, live
The MGM Singles Collection - Expanded CD Edition (7A Records, 2016)
Out of Nowhere (7A Records, 2017)
Live in Japan  (7A Records, 2020)
Dolenz Sings Nesmith  (7A Records, 2021) - produced by Christian Nesmith
Demoiselle (7A Records, 2022) - expanded deluxe edition

Singles
"Don't Do It"/"Plastic Symphony III" (Challenge, 1967) (recorded in 1965) US No. 75
"Huff Puff"/"Fate (Big Ben)" (Challenge, 1967) (recorded in 1965)
"Do It in the Name of Love"/"Lady Jane" (Bell, 1971) - with Davy Jones
"Easy on You"/"Oh Someone" (MGM, 1971)
"A Lover's Prayer"/"Unattended in the Dungeon" (MGM, 1972)
"Johnny B. Goode"/"It's Amazing to Me" (Lion, 1972) - with Starship
"Daybreak"/"Love War" (Romar, 1973)
"The Buddy Holly Tribute"/"Ooh, She's Young" (Romar, 1974)
"I Remember the Feeling"/"You and I" (Capitol, 1975) - with Dolenz, Jones, Boyce & Hart
"I Love You and I'm Glad That I Said It"/"Saving My Love for You" (Capitol, 1975) - with Dolenz, Jones, Boyce & Hart
"Christmas Is My Time of Year"/"White Christmas" (Harmony, 1976) - with Davy Jones & Peter Tork
"Lovelight"/"Alicia" (Chrysalis, 1979)
"To Be or Not to Be"/"Beverly Hills" (JAM, 1981)
"Tomorrow"/"Fat Sam's Grand Slam" (A&M, 1983) - with the Bugsy Malone Gang
"Chance of a Lifetime"/"Livin' on Lies" (7A Records, 2016)
"Porpoise Song"/"Good Morning Good Morning"/"Crying in the Rain"/"Randy Scouse Git" (7A Records, 2016) - with Christian Nesmith and Circe Link
"Sunny Girlfriend"/"Zor and Zam" (Live in Japan, 1982) (7A Records, 2016)

Filmography

Film

Television

Stage
 1977–1978: The Point!, Mermaid Theatre, London, England (Role: Count's Kid / The Leafman)
 1983: Bugsy Malone, Her Majesty's Theatre, London, England (director)
 1994–1998: Grease, Eugene O'Neill Theatre, NYC (Role: Vince Fontaine - replacement)
 2004: Aida, Palace Theatre, NYC (Role: Zoser - replacement)
 2006: Pippin, Goodspeed Opera House, East Haddam, Connecticut (Role: Charlemagne)
 2010: Hairspray, Grand Canal Theatre, Dublin, Ireland (Role: Wilbur Turnblad - alternate)

References

Further reading
 Dye, David. Child and Youth Actors: Filmography of Their Entire Careers, 1914-1985. Jefferson, NC: McFarland & Co., 1988, p. 24.

External links

 
 
 
 Micky's First Television Show: Circus Boy
 Former Monkee still a player
 2006 radio interview with Micky

1945 births
Living people
American male singers
American pop rock singers
American rock drummers
American male film actors
American male child actors
American male television actors
The Monkees members
Songwriters from California
American radio DJs
American television directors
Television producers from California
American theatre directors
American male voice actors
Apex Records artists
Challenge Records artists
Participants in American reality television series
Male actors from Los Angeles
Musicians from Los Angeles
American expatriates in England
American people of Slovenian descent
Los Angeles Valley College people
Alumni of the Open University
20th-century American male actors
People from Bell Canyon, California
Chrysalis Records artists

20th-century American drummers
American male drummers
Grant High School (Los Angeles) alumni
Dolenz family
Top of the Pops presenters